Scott Baio Is 46...and Pregnant is an American reality series that aired on VH1 from January to March 2008. The series stars Scott Baio.

Synopsis
The series focuses on Baio and his wife, Renee, as he copes with the realization of becoming a first-time father to a baby girl at the age of 46.

External links

2008 American television series debuts
2008 American television series endings
2000s American reality television series
English-language television shows
Pregnancy-themed television shows
VH1 original programming